The 2005 FIA GT Motorcity GT 500 was the tenth race for the 2005 FIA GT Championship season.  It took place at the Dubai Autodrome, United Arab Emirates, on November 18, 2005.

Official results
Class winners in bold.  Cars failing to complete 70% of winner's distance marked as Not Classified (NC).

Statistics
 Pole Position – #17 Russian Age Racing – 1:55.215
 Fastest Lap – #11 Larbre Compétition – 1:56.015
 Average Speed – 159.030 km/h

External links
 Official Results
 Race results

M
FIA GT Motorcity GT 500